Jasmine Bacurnay Lee (born Jasmine Bacurnay y Villanueva; January 6, 1977) is a South Korean television personality, actress and civil servant. Elected as a proportional representative in South Korea's National Assembly in 2012, she is the first non-ethnic Korean and naturalized South Korean to become a lawmaker.

Early life and education
Jasmine met South Korean mariner Lee Dong-ho in Davao del Norte when she was still a college student majoring in biology at Ateneo de Davao University in 1994. They got married and first visited South Korea in 1995 and finally united in 1996. They have two children, a son Lee Seung-geun and a daughter Lee Seung-yeon. She became a naturalized South Korean in 1998. Her husband died of a heart attack in 2010 while saving their daughter from drowning in a whirlpool in a mountain stream in Okcheon, Gangwon while on a family vacation.

Career
Since 2006, she has been a panelist on the KBS program "Love in Asia" and has also appeared on a Korean language program on educational channel EBS.

As an actress, she played the role of the mother of lead actor Yoo Ah-in in the highly acclaimed  2011 film Punch which drew 5.3 million viewers. She also appeared in the 2010 film Secret Reunion.

In January 2012, Lee became the first Filipino to receive the Korea Image Millstone Award from the Corea Image Communication Institute (CICI). She was cited for her volunteer and charity works for foreign immigrants in South Korea. An advocate of multiculturalism in South Korea, she regularly gives lectures about the subject to teachers and student leaders.

She is the secretary general of Waterdrop, a charity formed by foreign spouses of South Koreans, and worked at the Foreign Residents Assistance Division of the Seoul Metropolitan Government.

On April 11, 2012, she was elected as a proportional representative in South Korea's National Assembly election following her party's majority victory in the polls held. With her win, she made history in South Korea as the first Filipina and naturalized South Korean to become a lawmaker. Lee's win was a result of the victory of the ruling Saenuri Party, to which she belongs.

Lee was excluded from the party's list for the 2016 election and left office on May 29, 2016.

Criticism
Since the 2012 election, Lee has been hit by charges of misrepresenting her education, after claiming on national television to have attended medical school in the Philippines when in fact she had simply taken biology classes during college.

Some South Koreans engaged in racist criticism of Lee, stating that she was not a "true" South Korean due to being from the Philippines. One South Korean spoke out against the racist behavior of Lee's critics, stating that South Koreans were more concerned about engaging in racist vitriol against politicians, whereas in other countries, people were more concerned about a politician's professional qualifications.

References

1977 births
Visayan people
Liberty Korea Party politicians
Filipino television presenters
Filipino women television presenters
Filipino activists
Women activists
People from Davao City
Living people
Members of the National Assembly (South Korea)
Filipino emigrants to South Korea
Naturalized citizens of South Korea
South Korean activists
South Korean women activists
South Korean people of Filipino descent
South Korean women television presenters
Ateneo de Davao University alumni